Susana Paula de Jesus Feitor, DamIH (born 28 January 1975) is a Portuguese racewalker. She was born in Alcobertas.

Achievements

References

1975 births
Living people
Portuguese female racewalkers
Athletes (track and field) at the 1992 Summer Olympics
Athletes (track and field) at the 1996 Summer Olympics
Athletes (track and field) at the 2000 Summer Olympics
Athletes (track and field) at the 2004 Summer Olympics
Athletes (track and field) at the 2008 Summer Olympics
Olympic athletes of Portugal
Technical University of Lisbon alumni
World Athletics Championships medalists
European Athletics Championships medalists
World Athletics Championships athletes for Portugal
Universiade medalists in athletics (track and field)
Universiade silver medalists for Portugal
Medalists at the 2001 Summer Universiade
People from Rio Maior
Sportspeople from Santarém District